Bhaskar Nagar is a village in Savalyapuram, mandal in Guntur district, part of Andhra Pradesh, India.

History 
Bhaskar Nagar is a small village comprising nearly 100 houses. It has been founded by Bhaskar Rao, hence the name Bhaskar Nagar. Most of the inhabitants have come from villages near vinukonda in guntur.
This village is part of Guntur District.

Festivals
Sri rama navami 

Vinayaka chaturthi

Vijaya dashami

Makar Sankranti

Villages in Guntur district